Josef Pröll (born 14 September 1968, in Stockerau, Austria) is an Austrian former politician who was the chairman of the Austrian People's Party from 2008 until 2011. He was Vice Chancellor and Minister of Finance.

Previously, he was the Federal Minister of Agriculture, Forestry, Environment, and Water Management. He was also in charge of rethinking the party's positions and developing a more liberal socio-economic stance. On 28 November 2008, he was elected as the new federal party chairman by 89.6% of delegates at a party conference in Wels.

After two thromboses he suffered a pulmonary embolism in March 2011. A few weeks later, on 13 April, he resigned from all political functions. His successor was the Foreign Minister, Michael Spindelegger.

He is the nephew of Erwin Pröll.

References

External links 

 Josef Pröll at the ÖVP website

1968 births
Living people
Vice-Chancellors of Austria
Finance Ministers of Austria
Members of the National Council (Austria)
Austrian People's Party politicians
Agriculture ministers of Austria
University of Natural Resources and Life Sciences, Vienna alumni
21st-century Austrian politicians
People from Stockerau